During their career, Bulletman and Bulletgirl have met many enemies.

The Black Rat
A superstrong and durable criminal in a black rat costume, who is feared by many criminals. In All-American Comics #2 he was thrown into a vat of molten steel in a fight with Bulletman and apparently killed.

The Black Spider
Only appearing in Bulletman #1, The Black Spider is a masked criminal boss with a pet venomous spider named Suzy who is trying to murder people who sent him to jail, and nearly succeeds in killing Seargent Kent after kidnapping him. He is Jules Rey, a Frenchman who was sent to prison, went blind, and made friends with the spiders who crawled through the walls, but he is killed.

The Comedian
Graves, the butler to a wealthy comedian, sends death threats to his boss, causing Bulletman and Bulletgirl to be called. He kidnaps the man, causing the Flying Detectives to search the house, before finally finding a hidden passage. They find traps in the passage but manage to get through. Some skeletal hands seize Bulletgirl's throat from behind, preventing her from speaking, and drag her away without Bulletman noticing. They finally meet each other again. They find the Comedian tied to a pole and gagged in a room. They are told two sheets of glass containing acid block their way. Bulletman breaks a small hole in the glass, then he and Bulletgirl remain in the air until the acid has run out. They then free the man and chase a masked villain. Finally, they capture and unmask him, revealing himself to be the Butler.

Crackpot
A criminal who is a mechanical genius. He is defeated by Bulletman, but returns in Bulletman #12 with a robot and a robot dog, only to be beaten again.

Doctor Mood
Only appearing in Bulletman #1, he is a bald ugly-faced Nazi spy with a monocle who kidnaps and murders an admiral, then tries to engineer an invasion of New York with a hidden tank battalion and become Dictator of America while Hitler rules Europe. His men captured Bulletgirl after knocking her out by running over her with a tank. They tied her hands and tried to lower her into a fiery pit. However, the tank battalion was defeated, Bulletman rescued Bulletgirl, and Mood was jailed.

Doctor Riddle
A hunchbacked criminal who leaves riddles in connection to his crimes. Riddle first appeared in Bulletman #6. In his first appearance he causes crimes around the city, beginning with the murder of a millionaire, and leaves riddles for clues to them, like "What has 18 legs and catches flies? Answer: A baseball team he's going to try to rob". His final plan is to convert a new Observatory telescope to burn all the inhabitants of Boston to death, but will leave gold intact. However, Bulletman and Bulletgirl have solved an earlier riddle and leave a riddle for him, then reveals the answers are his fists and knocks Doctor Riddle off a building, although it is later revealed that he survived.

He later teamed up with the second Weeper in Mary Marvel #8. Susan Kent (a.k.a. Bulletgirl) attends Mary Batson's high school graduation. While the two young heroines are walking a noose is thrown around Susan's neck from a second-story window. Susan is pulled into the window by her old enemy Doctor Riddle and his new ally, the Weeper II. Mary says her magic world, transforming into Mary Marvel, and saves Susan. Doctor Riddle leaves a riddle, luring them to an asylum where they are both captured and trapped in an airtight cell, but they are able to escape. Bulletgirl and Mary Marvel eventually apprehend the evil duo.

The Dome
A criminal who is on trial for murdering someone and stealing a jeweled necklace. He is taken to the asylum after pretending to be insane by making paper dolls and acting hysterical. While some doctors are examining him, he uses his abnormally strong head to break out by ramming a guard and breaking open the walls. Sergeant Kent, his daughter and Jim are unable to stop the Dome, but Jim and Susan then change to Bulletman and Bulletgirl. The Dome jumps off a cliff but lands on his head and survives. He then tells his men they must find a mama doll in a blue dress. He starts taking the dolls and tearing their heads off, leading to the story title of "The Doll Killers". When a man says he will call the police, he is shot dead. Bulletman puts an ad in the paper of a second-hand doll, calling himself Namtellub, Bulletman backwards. When the men rush in, they are met by Bulletgirl, who changes into her outfit before Bulletman appears. However, Bulletman's blow does not match the Dome, who smashes their heads, knocking the helmet off of and stunning Bulletman. He then knocks Bulletgirl out with a wood plank from behind. Their hands are tied and they are each placed on chairs, with nooses around their necks attached to a chandelier. If one gets off of the chair, they will hang the other. The Dome leaves, saying they have given him an idea, but Bulletman sees the chandelier does not look so strong. At his plan they jump together, and the chandelier breaks. They recover their helmets and fly after the Dome. Bulletman realises he has gone to a second-hand store. The Dome smashes open many dolls, and when the Flying Detectives enter he charges at Bulletman, but he dodges making the Dome hit an iron pole. He beats him up and the clerk hits him with a doll which breaks open, revealing a diamond necklace. He hid it in there when he was trapped by the Police, but forgot to mark it.

The Engraver
Only appearing in Bulletman #6, The Engraver is disguised as a Swami he apparently gives money away to people, but they are forgeries, as the flying detectives discover after attending a performance. The 'Swami' takes the real change for the money and gives forgeries. They attack him, but he escapes by removing his Swami outfit then giving them false information. They track him down by analysing the ink and going somewhere which has ordered a lot of the ink type, but are captured after Bulletgirl tries to save a falling crook, but is hit on the head with an ink bottle, and when Bulletman sees if she is all right, he is seized, and they both have their hands tied while the Engraver tries to kill them by filling the room with gas. Bulletman frees himself on glass shards, breaks open a window for air as Bulletgirl has nearly been overcome, then frees Bulletgirl. They track the Engraver to a floating casino, as Bulletman releases they were bound with sailor's knots, both the thugs are killed, and the Engraver later falls to his death in a furnace after tripping over.

The Fat Fiend
Only appearing in Bulletman #6, he is an overweight murderer who commits brutal murders and has enormous strength and durability, but a hatred of being called fat, poisoning two boys who call him this with a quarter dipped in poison. He captures Bulletgirl after yanking of her helmet and tries to poison her, but she is rescued by Bulletman after he finds her helmet and realises she has been captured who fights the Fat Fiend but stops to help Bulletgirl. While trying to escape the Fat Fiend trips over her helmet and is captured.

The Fiddler
Only appearing in Bulletman #11, The Fiddler is a villain whose fiddle can hypnotize anyone.

Fatzo Gutz
Only appearing in Master Comics #77, Fatzo Gutz is a gluttonous criminal, who when released from jail starts safe-robbing, with the aid of a cardboard safe image he sets up to cover the real safe real robbed from those outside. He captures Bulletgirl but she alerts Bulletman and he is able to surprise Fatzo and his gang, capturing them all.

Invisible Man
Only appearing in All-American Comics #2, he is a criminal who discovers a way to become invisible and commits crimes. Bulletman and Bulletgirl discover his hideout in a cave and capture him.

Man of the Ages
Only appearing in Americas Greatest Comics issue #3. About a million years ago a criminal is thrown into the chasm of death, though he claims he will live for as long as evil does. In 1942 a man at a Zoo releases the lions. Jim Barr hears this and changes into Bulletman, who stops the lions, but the Man fires a gun at him, releasing blue poison gas, that would have killed an ordinary man, but only knocks Bulletman out. The Man of the Ages then goes to a dam, kills a workman, and meets Bulletman again. This time Bulletman uses a spanner to knock the gun from his hand. The Man of the Ages has his head hit with enough force to split the skull of an Ox and pretends to be unconscious. When Bulletman goes to him he is hit with both feet and knocked out. The Man of the Ages then goes to get enough dynamite to blow up the dam and kill the people in the town below. Bulletgirl finds the dead workman and wakes up Bulletman, who orders her to use the whistle to warn the people, who start moving to higher ground. The Man of the Ages hears the whistle and tries to work harder with the dynamite, but is knocked into the water by Bulletman, who says he may return in a future age.

The Man who was dressed to kill
He only appears in Bulletman #6. A criminal who uses deadly gadgets disguised as ordinary things, a hidden poison dart shooter and an electrocuting cane, he commits crimes and murders, but is captured by Bulletman and Bulletgirl, although he nearly kills Bulletgirl with his poison, and she is only saved by Bulletman inventing an antidote from analyzing its use on an earlier victim. While trying to escape, he is shot by Sergeant Kent and killed, but he later returns.

Matt and Lunk
Only appearing in Master Comics #81, Matt and Lunk are two crooks who decide to impersonate British bibliophiles who are checking an original Shakespeare volume worth $100,000. They pretend to be drivers, then knock out the two, stealing their clothes and papers. Bulletman realizes they are fakes and with Bulletgirl follows them back to their hotel, where the Bibliophiles are bound and gagged. However, as Bulletgirl comes in a knife is thrown which cuts a rope and makes the window fall onto Bulletgirl's neck, trapping her. Bulletman tries to help her but is knocked out from behind. He and Bulletgirl are then bound and gagged, and the crooks leave. Bulletman knocks the knife in the wall down, cutting his hands free. He unties himself, then Bulletgirl and stops the criminals. He reveals he knew the crooks were fakes as they claimed to be using a car from Britain, but the steering wheel was on the wrong side.

'Midas' Malone
Only appearing in Bulletman #4, 'Midas' Malone is a greedy criminal who after engineering a jailbreak with the aid of henchmen disguised as or who are guards takes refuge in a castle and captures Bulletman with a silent cannon fired by compressed air that knocks his helmet off, throws him in a dungeon, then causes a crime spree. Bulletgirl rescues her partner after she sees and follows one of the gang causing Bulletman's helmet and Bulletman causes the air cannon to explode in the face of 'the greediest man in America'. Midas is either killed or jailed.

The Mocker
Only appearing in Bulletman #6, The Mocker is an actor who mocks a stage performer before finally killing him, but he is caught by the Flying Detectives.

Mr. Ego
Only appearing in Bulletman #8, Mr. Ego is an egotistic criminal mastermind who performs crimes around the city after revealing their location to the police and hates anybody else acting like they are commanding him. He plans to capture Bulletman after kidnapping a Millionaire's son by giving him a poisoned sweet, then having his men dress up as ambulance drivers. He captures Bulletman using an electromagnet that gets his helmet off, then binds and gags him and leaves to commit a crime, leaving one of his henchmen to shoot him. However, Bulletgirl rescues him, revealing she taped her helmet on with adhesive tape to get past the electromagnet. He then tries to rob a train of platinum by turning a tank of water into powerful acid then using a bomb to send it onto the train. The Flying Detectives attack his gang, so he shoots them and tries to escape on a handcar, although he does not notice a train and is thrown of a bridge into the waters below, where he probably drowns.

The Murder Prophet
A criminal who makes prophecies of doom, then fulfills them. First appears in Bulletman #6 where he tells his prophecies to a crooked newspaper editor. When Bulletman goes after him he throws Bulletgirl of a building to delay him. He is apparently killed in Bulletman #7 when a radio in the Revenge Syndicate's base short-circuited and caused a fire.

The Revenge Syndicate
A villain team which appeared only once in Bulletman #7 (September 16, 1942). The Revenge Syndicate was started by the Murder Prophet and joined by the Weeper and the Black Rat. At first they were at odds with each one wanting to be the chief of the group. The Weeper came up with the idea that they roll dice to see who would be chief, the person with the highest roll would go first; the person with the second highest would go second; and the person with the third highest would go third.

The Murder Prophet won the first roll. His plan was to rob an art museum, by pretending to be visitors, with the aid of the Black Rat emerging from the sewer with a machine gun. Bulletman and Bulletgirl stopped them, but they escaped.

The Weeper went second. His plan was for the Murder Prophet to pretend to be a psychic at a charity carnival after kidnapping the real one. The Murder Prophet told a superstitious rich woman who was running the carnival to move her money so it would not be stolen. They were going to steal the money while it was being moved and even steal the car. Bulletman and Bulletgirl stopped them after realising their plot. They lifted the car they were in and threw it in the lake. The Black Rat was thrown in also while trying to escape with the loot, but was revived by the cold water, and saved the Murder Prophet and the Weeper.

The three realized that Bulletman had thwarted their plans prior and they needed to eliminate him if they ever wanted to succeed. The Black Rat met several criminals, who agreed to pay $100,000 if he got rid of Bulletman.

The Black Rat went third. His plan was to send out a radio broadcast to lure Bulletman to an abandon shack. They set up a dummy of the Black Rat. Bulletman and Bulletgirl went inside the shack. The Revenge Sundicate went inside and beat up Bulletman. To their surprise Bulletman had set up a dummy of his own. Bulletman and Bulletgirl beat them up and a fire was started when the radio was broken which possibly killed them as nobody got out.

Senesco
Only appearing in Bulletman #16, Senesco is a rival to Mr. Kaye, President of Acme Construction Co. and the head of the Senesco Construction Co. He disguises himself as a worker to sabotage an underwater tunnel Kaye is having built, hoping the city will give him the contract, but Bulletman and Bulletgirl stop him.

Unholy Three
First appearing in Master Comics #17. The cunning dwarf Nosey, Herbert the ape, and the hulking Brutus with the strength of 20 people are the Unholy Three and under the command of J. Twiddley Fairchild, a long-hair professor type. They went up against Bulletman and Bulletgirl a couple of times.

During a prison break, Fairchild is shot and killed (Master Comics #18, 1941) making the three just three. They succeeded in kidnapping Bulletgirl, but Bulletman was able to defeat them.

Weeper I
First appearing in Master Comics #23. The arch-foe of Bulletman and Bulletgirl, the Weeper is capable of the most brutal of murders, but sheds tears for his victims; he hates to see people happy but feels bad after he hurts them. The Weeper wears a blue opera cape, a top hat and carries a small walking stick and tear gas bombs. He also drives a hearse and is accompanied by his henchman, the Bittermen.

Weeper II
After his death in unknown circumstances, the original Weeper was replaced by his son the Weeper II, first appearing in Mary Marvel #8. He was the only one to follow them into DC comics, where he teamed up with the Joker to steal jewels on Earth-S during King Kull's plan to wipe out humanity on all three Earths, but was defeated and jailed with help from Bulletman and Bulletgirl.

Wizard
Only appearing in Master Comics #36, Wizard is a villain who is able to manipulate electricity.

Further reading
 Read Bulletman #1, featuring the Black Spider and Doctor Mood.
 Read Bulletman #4, featuring Midas Malone.
 Read Bulletman #7, featuring the Revenge Syndicate.
 Read Mary Marvel #8, featuring the first appearance of the second Weeper, at Fury Comics.
 Read Bulletman #16, featuring Senesco.
 Read All-American Comics #2, featuring the last appearance of the Black Rat, at Fury Comics.

Lists of DC Comics characters
 
Lists of DC Comics supervillains